Phunk Junkeez is the Phunk Junkeez' first album, released in 1992 under their label Naked Language. It was re-released on March 21, 2002, under the Ichiban label.

Track listing
"Why" – 2:57
"Radio Sucks" – 2:22
"I Am a Junkee" – 2:50
"Kicking Flaver" – 3:02
"Going Down to Buckeye" – 2:46
"Uncontrollable Urge" – 3:09
"The End" – 4:10
"Crazy" – 2:36
"Pump It Up Some" – 1:33
"Thick Like Mornin' Dick" – 2:46
"Hip Hop Rock'n'Roll" – 2:32
"Swing-O-Things" – 3:00
"Trouble" – 2:24
"Dalyla" – 5:38

References

1992 debut albums
Phunk Junkeez albums